SpecOps is a fictional overarching British governmental force in Jasper Fforde's Thursday Next series of novels. It was established in 1928 to handle policing duties "too unusual or too specialized" to be handled by the regular police. The force and divisions are similar in name (for example SO27) to the real world Specialist Operations of the Metropolitan Police Service. When introduced in The Eyre Affair, the divisions are described as "Below the Eight, Above the Law".

Known SpecOps divisions
 SpecOps 1: The division that polices SpecOps itself.
 SpecOps 2: Weirder Stuff (aliens according to an unpublished chapter of The Eyre Affair), may be Thought Police.
 SpecOps 3: Office for Alternate Universe Travel (as opposed to time travel) a.k.a. Weird Stuff The Eyre Affair.
 SpecOps 4: SpecOps 4 is "pretty much the same" as SpecOps 5, but after a different target.
 SpecOps 5: Search & Containment. SpecOps 5 is given a man to track until "found and contained" (a euphemism for killed), then is posted with another target.  SpecOps 5's assignments have included Acheron Hades and his sister Aornis.
 SpecOps 6: National Security, the department responsible for protecting the president and prime minister. It has also been responsible for protecting Mycroft Next, presumably from the Russians, as he is a scientific genius.
 SpecOps 9: Antiterrorism.
 SpecOps 12: The ChronoGuard, or the Office for Special Temporal Stability. Responsible for policing the timestream, dealing with Anomalous Time Ripplation and repairing paradoxes and timephoons.
 SpecOps 13: Genetic detectives, responsible for the destruction of chimeras and the regulation of genetic engineered pets, including those formerly extinct. SpecOps 13 is also responsible for Neanderthal affairs.
 SpecOps 14: Tactical support, known for its sharpshooters and trigger-happiness.
 SpecOps 15: Drug Enforcement Agency.
 SpecOps 17: Suckers & Biters, the Vampire and Werewolf Disposal Operation. Despite a three-point confirmation procedure, every so often one of its operatives stakes a goth by mistake. SpecOps 17 also deals with Supremely Evil Beings, thousands of which are contained and placed in plain glass jars at the Loathsome Id Containment Facility; and ghosts, zombies, demons, and other supernatural beings.
 SpecOps 21: Transport Authority.
 SpecOps 22: English Aviation Authority.
 SpecOps 23: Food and Drugs administration.
 SpecOps 24: Art crime.
 SpecOps 25: Industrial Safeguards.
 SpecOps 26: Pasta Police.
 SpecOps 27: The Literary Detectives, the agency responsible for dealing with forged or stolen manuscripts and works of literature.
 SpecOps 28: Inland Revenue Services, including assessing income taxes.
 SpecOps 29: The Shakespeare division, granted its own wing of SpecOps rather than falling under the purview of SO-27.
 SpecOps 30: Neighbourly Disputes. (Note: on Jasper Fforde's official SpecOps website, SO-30 is given as the Public Services Enforcement Authority.)
 SpecOps 31: Good Taste Re-education Authority. In First Among Sequels it is the Cheese Enforcement Agency.
 SpecOps 32: Domestic Horticultural Enforcement Agency.
 SpecOps 33: Entertainments Facilitation Department.
 SpecOps 34: GlobalWebPolice.

Known SpecOps Operatives

SpecOps 1
 Colonel Flanker

SpecOps 3
 Wednesday Next

SpecOps 5
 Fillip Tamworth (expired)
 Filbert Snood (expired). When introduced early in The Eyre Affair, he is the only man that Thursday Next had an interest in after she had left Landen 10 years earlier. 
 Agent Buckett
 Thursday Next
 Agents Kannon and Phodder, Agents Dedmen and Walken, and Agents Slorter and Lamme.

SpecOps 9
 Agent Buckett

SpecOps 12
 Lavoisier
 Colonel Next
 Friday Next
 Filbert Snood
 Captain Marat
 Colonel Rutter
 Bendix Scintilla, Chronoguard recruiter

SpecOps 13
 Mr. Stiggins (Neanderthal, head of department)

Specops 14
 Miles Hawke

SpecOps 17
 Spike Stoker

SpecOps 27
 Thursday Next
 Bowden Cable
 Victor Analogy

SpecOps 28
 Agent Lamb

SpecOps 32
 John Smith

References

 The Eyre Affair, by Jasper Fforde
 Lost in a Good Book, by Jasper Fforde
 Something Rotten, by Jasper Fforde
 Jasper Fforde's official SpecOps website at Thursdaynext.com

Thursday Next series